The 2017 Montreal Alouettes season was the 51st season for the team in the Canadian Football League and their 63rd overall. The Alouettes finished the season in 4th place in the East Division with a disappointing 3–15 record. The 15 losses are a team record, breaking the previous record of 14 set during the 1986 season when the Alouettes went 4–14. And the 1982 season when they finished 2–14.

The Alouettes failed to improve upon their 7–11 record from 2016 and were eliminated from the playoffs on October 9, 2017 after a loss to the Edmonton Eskimos, making this the third straight season that they missed the playoffs (it was the first time the team missed the playoffs for three straight years since their re-activation). This was the first full season for head coach Jacques Chapdelaine, until he was fired after a 3–8 start and replaced by general manager Kavis Reed on an interim basis. Chapdelaine served as head coach in an interim capacity for six games in the previous season. This is also the first season under new general manager Kavis Reed.

Off-season

Front office changes 
This is the first season since the Alouettes returned to Montreal in 1996 that Jim Popp will not be the team's general manager. It was announced on November 7, 2016 that Popp would not return to the Alouettes organization in 2017. In the week following the 104th Grey Cup, the Alouettes interviewed Danny Maciocia (head coach of the University of Montreal), Joey Abrams (Alouettes assistant general manager) and Brock Sunderland (Redblacks assistant general manager) for the vacant general manager position. As of December 7, 2016, Sunderland was no longer considered a candidate and Maciocia was not in negotiations with the team, having only taken part in one formal meeting. Not long after, Maciocia confirmed that he would remain at the University of Montreal. Two days later, Herb Zurkowsky from the Montreal Gazette reported that Kavis Reed (Alouettes Special Teams coach) was "the dark horse candidate" to win the GM position. By December 12, 2016, Reed had a formal interview with the Alouettes front office, making him the fourth official candidate for the position; prior to that, it had just been informal conversations. On December 14, 2016, the Montreal Alouettes held a press conference to announce Patrick Boivin as President and CEO, Kavis Reed as general manager, and Jacques Chapdelaine's retention as the team's head coach. Chapdelaine had served as the interim head coach for the final six games of the previous season.  On December 20, 2016, the Alouettes announced that assistant GM Joey Abrams, who had been with the organization for the past dozen seasons, would be leaving the club.

On January 25, 2017 the Alouettes announced that Catherine Raiche and Joe Mack would become assistant general managers. Raiche was promoted from her previous position with the Alouettes as Coordinator of Football Administration and held the title of Assistant General Manager of Football Operations. Mack, the former Winnipeg Blue Bombers general manager, was the Assistant General Manager of Player Personnel.

CFL draft 
The 2017 CFL Draft took place on May 7, 2017. The Alouettes traded their first round pick to the BC Lions for the rights to Vernon Adams. The team also acquired another sixth round pick after trading S. J. Green to the Toronto Argonauts.

Preseason 

 Games played with white uniforms.

Regular season

Standings

Schedule

 Games played with colour uniforms.
 Games played with white uniforms.
 Games played with alternate uniforms.

Team

Roster

Coaching staff

References 

Montreal Alouettes seasons
2017 Canadian Football League season by team
2010s in Montreal
2017 in Quebec